Sheng Si Qiao is a book by Hong Kong writer Lilian Lee. It was adapted into a Mainland Chinese TV series in 2007.

2007 Chinese novels
Novels by Lilian Lee
Chinese novels adapted into television series